Kilclooney or Kilcloony is a townland and civil parish in County Galway, Ireland. It is one of three civil parishes in which Ballinasloe is located. It is regarded as the place in which Saint Grellan settled and established a church, which has since been replaced by the currently-standing, run-down church.

References

Ballinasloe
Townlands of County Galway
Civil parishes of County Galway